Tillandsia velutina is a species of flowering plant in the genus Tillandsia. This species is native to Chiapas and Guatemala.

Cultivars
 Tillandsia 'Royale'

References

velutina
Flora of Chiapas
Flora of Guatemala
Epiphytes
Plants described in 1994